The visa policy of the Philippines is governed by Commonwealth Act No. 613, also known as the Philippine Immigration Act, and by subsequent legislation amending it.  The Act is jointly enforced by the Department of Foreign Affairs (DFA) and the Bureau of Immigration (BI). Visitors from 157 countries are permitted visa-free entry for periods ranging from 14 to 59 days.

Generally, foreign nationals who wish to enter the Philippines require a visa unless the visitor is:

A citizen of a member state of the Association of Southeast Asian Nations (ASEAN).
A citizen of a non-ASEAN member state whose nationals are allowed to enter the Philippines visa-free.
A balikbayan and is only returning to the Philippines temporarily.

Visa policy map

Visa waiver program
The Philippine visa waiver program is governed by Executive Order No. 408, signed by President Carlos P. Garcia on November 9, 1960, and by subsequent executive issuances amending it. While visas are issued by the BI, the program itself is administered by the Department of Foreign Affairs, which maintains a list of countries eligible to participate in the program. In principle, nationals of countries which maintain diplomatic relations with the Philippines and whose nationals are not classified as restricted nationals by the DFA are allowed to enter the Philippines without a visa. Eligible nationals availing of visa-free entry must possess passports valid for at least six months beyond their contemplated period of stay.

On July 1, 2013, the Bureau of Immigration began implementing an extended visa waiver for covered nationals from 21 to 30 days, which the Philippine government hoped would boost tourism

Visa-exempt foreign nationals may extend their stay two months per extension but not exceeding the maximum period of two years. Foreign nationals who require a visa may extend their stay one month per extension but not exceeding the maximum period of six months and must have a ticket valid for onward travel.

In March 2015, it was proposed to extend the visa exemption to citizens of China and India.

Holders of passports of the following jurisdictions do not require a visa for Philippines:

Replacement visas
Nationals of  traveling as tourists and holding a valid visa issued by Australia, Canada, Japan, United States or a Schengen Area state may enter and stay without a visa for up to 7 days.

Nationals of  holding a valid tourist, business or resident visa issued by Australia, Canada, Japan, Singapore, United Kingdom, United States or a Schengen Area state may enter and stay without a visa for up to 14 days. They may enter from any port of entry.

Electronic Travel Authorization
Citizens of  may apply for an entry permit through the Electronic Travel Authorization system on the website of the Manila Economic and Cultural Office.

Visa required
Holders of passports issued by any country except the following may obtain a visa (for a fee) valid for 59 days on arrival:

Non-ordinary passports
Holders of diplomatic, official or service passports of the following countries enjoy an extended length of stay when compared to ordinary passports:

Holders of diplomatic, official or service passports of the following countries may enter without a visa while ordinary passport holders require one:

D — diplomatic passports
O — official passports
S — service passports

APEC Business Travel Card
Holders of passports issued by the following countries who possess an APEC Business Travel Card (ABTC) containing the "PHL" code on the reverse that it is valid for travel to Philippines can enter visa-free for business trips for up to 59 days.

ABTCs are issued to nationals of:

Types of visas
The Philippine Immigration Act prescribes fourteen different visas grouped into two broad categories:

Section 9 visas (non-immigrant visas), for temporary visits such as those for tourism, business, transit, study or employment
Section 13 visas (immigrant visas), for foreign nationals who wish to become permanent residents in the Philippines

Some visas have been introduced by subsequent legislation or proclamation of the President which are not classified by the Philippine Immigration Act as either being a Section 9 or Section 13 visa. These visas are called special visas and are issued to groups such as retirees, investors and entrepreneurs.

List of visas

Foreign travel statistics

See also

Visa requirements for Philippine citizens
Philippine passport
Immigration to the Philippines

References and Notes

External links
The Bureau of Immigration
Visa information from the Bureau of Immigration

Foreign relations of the Philippines
Philippines
Philippine immigration law